Shujaat is a given name. Notable people with the name include:

Shujaat Azeem (born 1951), Advisor to Prime Minister of Pakistan Mian Muhammad Nawaz Sharif on Aviation (2013–2016)
Shujaat Bukhari (1968–2018), Indian journalist, founding editor of Rising Kashmir, a Srinagar-based newspaper
Shujaat Ali Hasnie (born 1905), Pakistani banker, the 3rd Governor of the State Bank of Pakistan
Shujaat Hussain (born 1946), senior Pakistani conservative politician and business oligarch
Shujaat Ahmed Khan, Pakistani politician, Member of the Provincial Assembly of the Punjab
Shujaat Ali Khan (born 1964), Justice of the Lahore High Court
Shujaat Khan (born 1960), North Indian musician and sitar player
Shujaat Khan (engineer) (born 1965), Bangladeshi activist
Shujaat Nawaz, Pakistani politician, member of the Provincial Assembly of the Punjab
Syed Shujaat Ali Qadri (1941–1993), the first Grand Mufti of Pakistan, Judge of Federal Shariat Court
Khushbakht Shujaat (born 1948), Pakistani politician, member of the Senate of Pakistan

See also
Nishan-e-Shujaat, Order of Bravery, a Pakistan award for military and civilian acts of conspicuous gallantry